Lunnevi IP  is a football stadium in Grästorp, Sweden  and the home stadium for the football team IK Gauthiod. Lunnevi IP has a total capacity of 1,500 spectators.

References 

Football venues in Sweden